The  Washington Redskins season was the franchise's 22nd season in the National Football League (NFL) and their 16th in Washington, D.C.  The team improved on their 4–8 record from 1952 and finished 6-5-1.

Schedule

Standings

Washington
Washington Redskins seasons
Washing